Sabrina the Teenage Witch is an American television sitcom created by Nell Scovell, based on the Archie Comics series of the same name. It premiered on September 27, 1996, on ABC to over 17 million viewers in its "T.G.I.F." lineup.

It stars Melissa Joan Hart as American teenager Sabrina Spellman, who, on her 16th birthday, learns she has magical powers (a departure from the Archie Comics series, in which she has known of her powers since an early age). She lives with her 600-year-old aunts, witches Hilda (played by Caroline Rhea) and Zelda (played by Beth Broderick), and their magical talking cat Salem (voiced by Nick Bakay), at 133 Collins Road in the fictional Boston suburb of Westbridge, Massachusetts through the rest of the series.

The first four seasons aired on ABC from September 27, 1996 to May 5, 2000. The final three seasons ran on The WB from September 22, 2000 to April 24, 2003.

Plot and premise
The show chronicles the adventures of Sabrina Spellman (played by Melissa Joan Hart), a girl who discovers on her 16th birthday that she is a witch. As a novice witch, her spells often go awry. Her witch aunts Hilda and Zelda Spellman (played by Caroline Rhea and Beth Broderick, respectively, until 2002) counsel her on the proper use of her magic and give her moral advice. Additionally, Hilda and Zelda must take care of Salem Saberhagen (voiced by Nick Bakay), a witch turned into a cat for trying to take over the world. Sabrina'''s basic premise and "genial loopiness" earned the show comparisons to the 1960s television series Bewitched.

The show included contemporary pop cultural references, with Sabrina often saying that she liked Britney Spears and No Doubt. It also mentioned human history alongside witch history, such as the Salem witch hunt, which Zelda tells Sabrina was not a hunt for real witches. Hilda mentions to Sabrina in Episode 1 that "for two months a bunny ruled all of England," causing the witches' council to turn back time, as if to say that mortals are ignorant at best. One episode also suggests that Jerry Springer is a witch when he hosts The Jerry Springer Show in the other realm.

While in the animated comic book series the story is set in the fictional town of Greendale, the television show is set in the fictional Boston suburb of Westbridge, Massachusetts.

The show spanned seven years over seven seasons, though each season was not a year.

Season 1 (1996–1997)
The pilot episode opens with Sabrina asleep on her 16th birthday, levitating above her bed. In the morning, her aunts reveal to her that she is a witch, but Sabrina does not believe them until she has a magical talk with her father from inside a book and her father reveals that he is a witch and Sabrina's mother is mortal. It is also revealed that Sabrina cannot see her mother (living in Peru) or the latter will be permanently transformed into a ball of wax. 

After a rough day at school, Sabrina accidentally turns Libby Chessler, the most popular but also the meanest girl in school, into a pineapple. Fearing that she will appear "weird" to her crush, Harvey Kinkle, Sabrina asks the witches' council to let her relive the day. The first season follows Sabrina as she tries to keep the balance between being a teenager and possessing magical powers. Sabrina's friend Jenny Kelley and her teacher, Mr. Pool, both exit the series without explanation after the first season.

Season 2 (1997–1998)

At the beginning of the second season, Sabrina turns 17 and learns that she must earn her witch's license or otherwise lose her magic abilities. However, she neglects her aunts' warnings to study for the license test and consequently fails it. Sabrina then must attend witch boot camp before she can take a makeup test, which she passes, though she only receives a learner's permit. Her aunts explain that she will be able to earn her license when she turns 18 ("when she can pay for the insurance") and that she will be tested throughout the year by a Quizmaster, Albert (Alimi Ballard), a witch who instructs other witches earning their licenses. Also introduced during the season are Sabrina's neurotic friend Valerie and the new school vice principal, Mr. Kraft, who finds Sabrina to be very odd and has a crush on Hilda.

Season 3 (1998–1999)
At the beginning of the third season, Sabrina earns her license, but learns that in order to use it, she must solve her family's secret. Throughout the season, family members visit her and provide clues. At the end of the season, she solves the family secret, that every member of the Spellman family is born with a twin. The season ends with Sabrina finally being granted her license.

Season 4 (1999–2000)
The fourth season begins with the news that Valerie has moved away while Libby has gone to boarding school. As one of the conditions for her witch's licence Sabrina is assigned to be a mentor, which is similar to a Quizmaster, except that Quizmasters are paid. Sabrina's charge is Dreama, a witch newly immigrated from the Other Realm. A new student, Brad Alcero, who is also Harvey's best friend, transfers to Sabrina's school. Because Brad has a witch-hunter gene (which allows him to turn a witch into a mouse if the witch reveals his/her magic), he takes an instant dislike to Sabrina who must keep herself and Dreama from using magic in front of Brad. 

Sabrina begins working at Bean There, Brewed That, a coffee shop, where Sabrina meets and is attracted to Josh (played by David Lascher), a college student and manager of the shop. After she kisses Josh, Harvey breaks up with her, though they soon get back together. Both Dreama and Brad are written out of the series without explanation over the course of the season. At the end of the season, Harvey reaches his "spell quota" meaning that no more spells may be used on him and rendering him immune to a memory spell that was recently placed on him. The season ends with Harvey confronting Sabrina over the fact she is a witch.

Season 5 (2000–2001)
At the beginning of the fifth season, Sabrina starts college at Adams College and moves out of her aunts' house and into a house with other students at Adams. It is revealed that Harvey broke up with Sabrina following the revelation she was a witch and went to college elsewhere, although he later calls her to make amends. Sabrina's roommates are Morgan Cavanaugh, a shallow girl (played by Elisa Donovan), Roxie King (played by Soleil Moon Frye), a social feminist and Miles Goodman (played by Trevor Lissauer), a geek who is obsessed with science fiction and the paranormal. Hilda and Zelda, feeling lonely without Sabrina, find ways to stay close to her. Hilda buys the coffee shop where Sabrina works and Zelda becomes a professor at Adams and starts dating Sabrina's English professor. The season ends with Sabrina and Josh giving into their feelings and sharing a passionate kiss.

Season 6 (2001–2002)
At the beginning of the sixth season, Josh and Sabrina get together but soon face a tough decision when Josh is tempted to move abroad to work as a photographer. More complications ensue when Harvey reappears, this time dating Morgan. At the end of the season, Sabrina sacrifices true love to save Hilda after Sabrina sabotages her relationship. Hilda recovers and is married, but Sabrina is crushed when Josh, Harvey and an attractive waiter announce they are all moving away and will never see her again. The season ends on a cliffhanger as Sabrina turns to stone and falls to pieces.

Season 7 (2002–2003)
At the beginning of the seventh and final season, Sabrina is put back together after Zelda sacrifices her adult years to save Sabrina.  Zelda and Hilda move to the Other Realm (Miles simply disappears between seasons without explanation) with Sabrina moving back into the house along with Morgan and Roxie. Sabrina gets a job as a writer for the entertainment magazine Scorch, but this storyline and all of its associated characters are dropped midway through the season. Sabrina then meets Aaron, the man to whom she becomes engaged. In the series finale, Sabrina calls off her wedding with Aaron and runs off with her soulmate Harvey at 12:36 p.m., the time of day when they had first met (a plot point in the Season 1 episode "As Westbridge Turns"). In the last scene of the series, Sabrina and Harvey ride off on his motorcycle to the song "Running" by No Doubt, Sabrina's favorite band.

Cast and characters

 Melissa Joan Hart as Sabrina Spellman, a teenager who discovers on her sixteenth birthday that she is a witch and comes from a long line of witches. As she struggles to master her magic, she often wreaks havoc on those around her. Sabrina moved into her college's dormitories at the beginning of the fifth season and then back into her aunts' house in the seventh season after they left for the Other Realm.
 Caroline Rhea as Hilda Spellman (seasons 1–6, guest season 7), one of the Spellman sisters. Hilda is the less rational and the more impulsive one. After giving up violin in the fourth season (she destroyed her violin with dynamite), Hilda purchased a clock shop. Later, after Sabrina moved out of the house, she purchased Bean There, Brewed That, the coffee shop where Sabrina worked, and renamed it Hilda's Coffee House. After her marriage at the end of the sixth season, she moved away with her husband. Hilda returned for the series finale. Her middle name, 'Sucker', is revealed in season 6, although her middle name was Antoinette in season 2. In the last episode of season 3, Hilda states that she is 620 years old however in episode 12 of season 5 Sabrina mentions she's about to celebrate her 650th birthday.
 Beth Broderick as Zelda Spellman (seasons 1–6, guest season 7), Sabrina's aunt and Hilda's older sister. Zelda, a scientist and college professor, is the more rational of the two Spellman sisters and is often the voice of reason when Hilda or Sabrina uses magic irresponsibly. At the end of the sixth season she gives up her maturity in order for Sabrina to be changed back to flesh and blood after being turned into stone when she lost her true loves. Sabrina advises a now child Zelda to leave for the other realm with a newly married Hilda, ensuring her that she is okay to live on her own. Zelda makes an appearance as a candle in the last episode to allow Sabrina's mother to attend Sabrina's wedding. In episode 6 of season 6 Hilda states that Zelda is 658 years old.
 Nick Bakay as Salem Saberhagen [Voice], a 500-year-old witch who was sentenced to 100 years as a talking cat because of his plans to take over the world, his sentence later had another 50 years added to it for making a second attempt. Besides Sabrina herself, he is the only character to remain for the entire seven seasons and in fact appears in every single episode.
 Nate Richert as Harvey Kinkle (seasons 1–4 and 6–7, cameos in season 5), Sabrina's boyfriend in the first four seasons. He breaks up with her when he finds out she is a witch. Amanda, Sabrina's cousin, tells him about Sabrina getting married and gives him his soul stone. He arrives at the church on his bike as Sabrina is running out. He is revealed to be her soul mate because their soul stones fit together. In the end, Sabrina leaves Aaron at the altar. Then Harvey and Sabrina run off together after they share a final kiss with Sabrina's favorite band, No Doubt, playing in the background as the closing theme.
 Jenna Leigh Green as Libby Chessler (seasons 1–3), Sabrina's arch-enemy while at high school. Libby is a spoiled rich girl and is often at the other end of Sabrina's spells as she learns to use them, leading Libby to often call Sabrina a "Freak" or "Freakster". Libby, a cheerleader, is seen to fancy Sabrina's love interest, Harvey, and makes many attempts to ask him out. Libby was sent to boarding school following the end of season 3.
 Michelle Beaudoin as Jenny Kelley (season 1), Sabrina's best friend during high school in the first season. Jenny befriended Sabrina on her first day, and also introduced Sabrina to Harvey. Jenny walked into the closet at the Spellman house and ended up in the Other Realm, where Sabrina and her aunts had to rescue her and make it out as a dream. Jenny is absent from the second season onwards without explanation, and is never mentioned again.
 Paul Feig as Mr. Eugene Pool (season 1), Sabrina's favorite teacher who teaches Biology during the first season. He was sometimes bitter and sarcastic, but always interesting and usually lively. Mr. Pool is not mentioned after season 1.
 Lindsay Sloane as Valerie Birkhead (seasons 2–3), Sabrina's best friend from the second season. She comes across as dim but it becomes apparent that she suffers from self-doubt when Sabrina casts a spell on her that backfired—making her overconfident and careless. She discovers that Sabrina is a witch after Sabrina tells her and Harvey on Friday the 13th. Valerie left to move to Alaska with her parents at the start of season 4.
 Martin Mull as Willard Kraft (seasons 2–4), the vice principal, and later principal, of Westbridge High, Sabrina's high school, and the on/off boyfriend of both Hilda and Zelda. Hilda mentions that herself and Zelda have stopped using magic on Willard, as it is starting to affect his mental state. This is also mentioned at the Jerry Springer Show when Zelda and Willard's ex-wife Lucy (who is a witch, unbeknownst to him) fight for his affections, in an adaption to the lie detector test, they performed the potion detector test showing he had extremely high amounts of magic in his system. The character left the series after season 4.
 Alimi Ballard as Quizmaster (season 2), also known as Albert, is Sabrina's tutor who helps teach her to use her magic properly to acquire her witch's license. As Sabrina gained her license in the first episode of season 3, the character's last appearance was in the last episode of season 2.
 David Lascher as Josh Blackhart (seasons 4–6), Sabrina's handsome co-worker in the Coffee Shop and later, love interest. Josh struggles with his career throughout his first two seasons, until he decides he wants to be a photographer. His relationship with Sabrina is much less consistent than that of her and Harvey. They often have problems to overcome. In the end, he leaves for Prague after Sabrina gives up her love life to save Hilda's life.
 Jon Huertas as Brad Alcerro (season 4), the new kid in school, but used to attend Westbridge High, before Sabrina went to that school. Brad is a witch hunter but doesn't know it. Sabrina tries to stay away from him, but every time she is in school and uses magic, Brad always sees it. In the episode "Dreama, the Mouse", Dreama makes a water fountain appear, Brad sees and says "You know, sometimes I think you're a real witch" and then Dreama turns into a mouse. In that same episode Brad loses his witch hunter gene through an operation. That is when Sabrina realized that he's just a jerk and now she can use magic on him.
 China Shavers as Dreama (season 4), the new kid in school, who causes a lot of trouble because she uses magic. She later turns out to be Sabrina's student. Sabrina has to teach Dreama how to control her magic. At the end of season 4 and the beginning of season 5, she is not mentioned and we don't know if she passed her test to get her witch's license.
 Soleil Moon Frye as Roxie King (seasons 5–7), Sabrina's mortal roommate during her college years and remains a very close friend to her after their graduation. An activist with a very cynical humor, her opinion often clashes with Sabrina's more preppy attitude towards life. Later, both seem to have an effect on each other, as Roxie grows to be much more honest and compassionate, while Sabrina matures and becomes more socially conscious.
 Elisa Donovan as Morgan Cavanaugh (seasons 5–7), Sabrina's third and final housemate, as well as her tutor, during her college years. Morgan is a talented fashion designer and a very good friend, but can also be shallow and even mischievous at times. She's the only known character who dated both of Sabrina's long term romantic interests (Harvey and Josh) as well as expressed interest in her fiancé, Aaron.
 Trevor Lissauer as Miles Goodman (seasons 5–6), Sabrina's housemate during her college years though, unlike Roxie and Morgan, he's never seen nor mentioned after the graduation. Miles is a goodhearted, but nerdy boy obsessed with all things supernatural. Miles often comes close to discovering Sabrina's secret. Throughout the series, he develops a crush on Zelda, and is hinted to harbor similar feelings for Sabrina and Roxie.

History and production

The unofficial pilot of the series was the April 1996 television movie Sabrina the Teenage Witch. The movie, produced by Viacom and Hartbreak Films and aired on Showtime, starred Melissa Joan Hart as the title character, Sabrina Sawyer, and Charlene Fernetz and Sherry Miller as Sabrina's aunts Zelda and Hilda, respectively. When the television series debuted on ABC later that year, Hart became Sabrina Spellman, and Beth Broderick and Caroline Rhea replaced Fernetz and Miller as Zelda and Hilda Spellman, respectively. In 2000, the show was dropped by ABC and picked up by The WB. When viewership began to wane, the show was canceled after seven seasons.

The television series was produced by Hartbreak Films and Viacom Productions, with Finishing the Hat Productions involved for the first season only.

Opening sequence
The opening titles of the first three seasons show Sabrina in front of a mirror posing with four different costumes and outfits as the cast members' names quickly flash on the bottom of the screen. The first three outfits are always the same, but the fourth one changes from episode to episode. At the end, Sabrina would say something related to the last costume (often a pun or a joke related to the costume or the content of the episode), and then magically disappear from head on down.

The opening sequence was changed for the fourth season, featuring a completely new theme and the show's main characters, starting with Sabrina, floating in bubbles while their names are displayed in gold letters and a voice chants "Secret" in the background.

The opening credits for the final three seasons are accompanied by a new vocal theme song and feature Sabrina at various locations around Boston: Harvard Bridge, Boston Common, Union Oyster House, Massachusetts State House, Quincy Market, Newbury Street, Harvard University, Tufts University and Beacon Hill. In the credits for Seasons 5 and 6, after leaving Newbury Comics on Newbury Street, Sabrina walks down a flight of stairs and computer graphics morph Sabrina into her room, lying on her bed next to Salem. In the seventh and final season, the computer graphics morph Sabrina arriving at Scorch. Upon pushing the door open, she is revealed to be walking into her house to greet Roxie, Morgan and Salem.

The house pictured as the Spellman residence is a Victorian mansion located at 64 E. Main St. in Freehold, New Jersey. The exteriors for Westbridge High School are those of Dwight Morrow High School in Englewood, New Jersey.

Departures
The show went through many cast changes, the first of which involved the unexplained departure of Sabrina's best friend Jenny Kelly (Michelle Beaudoin) and her teacher Mr. Pool (Paul Feig) at the end of the first season.

At the beginning of the fourth season, Valerie permanently departs the show along with Libby. Valerie's character moves away to Alaska with her family, while Libby transfers to a boarding school.

After the fourth season, several secondary actors left the show, including Martin Mull and Nate Richert, who played Sabrina's boyfriend Harvey since the first season. Harvey's character was dropped in order to give the show a different look as Sabrina was about to attend college. The decision was later rescinded, and Richert appeared in three episodes of Season 5 and then returned as a series regular in Seasons 6 and 7.

After the sixth season, Caroline Rhea and Beth Broderick, who had portrayed Sabrina's aunts since the show's premiere, decided to leave the show. When the character of Sabrina started to attend college, the role of her aunts became less important. Broderick felt that the role of Zelda had nothing more to offer, while Rhea landed her own syndicated talk show, The Caroline Rhea Show.

Trevor Lissauer, who played Sabrina's housemate Miles, left the show after appearing in Seasons 5 and 6. Producers felt that his character was not well received by fans and also had to make some budget cuts for the show's seventh and final season. Miles was never properly written out, leaving his fate undetermined.

Sabrina's love interest Josh, played by David Lascher, left for Prague after appearing from Seasons 4 through 6; Lascher reportedly wanted to pursue other projects. To fill the void, the producers brought in Aaron, played by Dylan Neal, as Sabrina's love interest in the show's final season.

Broadcast and release
In 2000 The WB network picked up the series after ABC canceled it.

United States syndication
The show was syndicated by Paramount Domestic Television for reruns on local stations, including Tribune-owned WB affiliates.

Reruns have aired on ABC Family, Nickelodeon/Nick at Nite, Noggin (as part of its teen block The N), TeenNick, MTV2, Hub Network, Logo TV, Antenna TV and Fuse. It currently airs on Rewind TV and is available to stream on Hulu, The Roku Channel, Amazon Prime Video, Pluto TV and Paramount+.

International syndication

In the United Kingdom, Sabrina previously aired on ITV and Nickelodeon, while it later began airing on Pop Girl, a free-to-air children's channel. The series was slightly edited for content on UK children's channels. In July 2012, which previously broadcast the first two seasons and the two subsequent movies before shutting down in October 2015. It has aired on 4Music since 2019, and previously on The Vault since 2014 until its subsequent rebrand as Trace Vault. In October 2021, the entire series became available to stream on Amazon Prime Video, but was removed at the end of September 2022.

The show can be seen in the Republic of Ireland on RTÉ2 weekdays at 5:10 p.m. as part of the youth-oriented show TRTÉ.

In Italy, the show aired on Italia 1 under the name Sabrina, vita da strega (Sabrina, life as a witch) from September 3, 1998 until May 28, 2004.

In Australia, the show aired on Eleven, the free-to-air channel owned by Network Ten (upon which Sabrina had originally aired) at 6:00 p.m. and until December 6, 2013, with repeats at 12:30 a.m., seven days a week.

In Canada, the show is available on Paramount+ (former CBS All Access) since the 2021 international launch and rebranding of the service.

In Russia, the first show of the series took place on the TV channel "Russia" on November 8, 2003, where it was originally broadcast until January 31, 2004 under the name "Academy of Witchcraft" and the first season was shown. Later, all seven seasons were shown in the period 2004-2006 on the STS channel (premiered on March 9, 2004).

Home media
In 2007, CBS Paramount Television released seasons 1–3 on DVD. CBS Television Distribution released seasons 4–7 on DVD. The official copyright holder for the series (as with all series originally produced by Viacom Productions) is CBS Studios Productions, LLC. For this home video release, music has been changed and many episodes are edited. Some musical performances were cut due to music licensing.

Episodes and U.S. ratings history

During its four-year run on ABC, Sabrina was the highest-rated series among the network's TGIF line-up. In the 2000–2001 season, the show moved to The WB after a negotiation dispute with ABC. While ABC was willing to renew the show for a fifth season, the network was not willing to pay the reported $1.5 million per episode that Viacom Productions, which produced the show, wanted. The WB then picked up the show for a mere $675,000 per episode, but agreed to commit to 66 episodes.

In other media

Video games
On June 11, 1999, Knowledge Adventure through Simon & Schuster Interactive and Havas Interactive officially announced the video games Sabrina the Teenage Witch: Spellbound, Sabrina the Teenage Witch: Brat Attack and Sabrina the Teenage Witch: Bundle of Magic for Macintosh and Microsoft Windows operating systems.

On March 29, 2001, Knowledge Adventure through Simon & Schuster Interactive and Havas Interactive officially announced the video game Sabrina the Teenage Witch: A Twitch in Time! for the PlayStation game system.

Multimedia

Animated series

An animated spin-off of the show, Sabrina: The Animated Series, started airing during the live action show's 4th season. The role of Sabrina was voiced by Hart's younger sister Emily Hart. Melissa Joan Hart voiced both aunts, Hilda and Zelda. This series was followed by a television film, Sabrina: Friends Forever, which in turn was followed by another series titled Sabrina's Secret Life. Neither Emily Hart nor Melissa Joan Hart returned for the television film or the follow up series. An animated spin-off focusing on Salem the Cat was also slated to debut in the 2001-02 season before it was scrapped.

A new animated spin-off was produced by Hub Network in 2013 called Sabrina: Secrets of a Teenage Witch''. In this version, Sabrina (voiced by Ashley Tisdale) is a witch princess in training so that she can one day rule the other realm.

Notes

References

External links

Sabrina the Teenage Witch at TeenNick's official website
Sabrina the Teenage Witch at TV Guide

 
1996 American television series debuts
1990s American high school television series
1990s American single-camera sitcoms
1990s American teen sitcoms
2000s American college television series
2000s American high school television series
2000s American single-camera sitcoms
2000s American teen sitcoms
2003 American television series endings
American Broadcasting Company original programming
American fantasy television series
American television shows featuring puppetry
English-language television shows
Television about magic
Television shows based on Archie Comics
Television series about families
Television shows set in Massachusetts
Television series by CBS Studios
The WB original programming
Television shows adapted into video games
Television series about witchcraft
Television series created by Nell Scovell
TGIF (TV programming block)
Television series about teenagers